Melnaattu Marumagan is a 2018 Tamil action film directed by MSS and produced by Mano Udhayakumar of Udhaya Creations. The film stars Rajkamal and Andreanne Nouyrigat in the leading roles, with Lollu Sabha Manohar and Muthukaalai in supporting roles. V. Kishorkumar composed the original score and soundtrack for the film, while Goutham Krishna handled the cinematography. Having begun production in September 2013, the film had went through production delays before being released on 16 February 2018.

Cast
Rajkamal as Sakthi
Andreanne as Andreanne 
Lollu Sabha Manohar
Muthukaalai

Production
In September 2013, director MSS convinced television actor Rajkamal to play the lead role in his film on a Tamil tour guide falling in love with a tourist. MSS chose to make Melnaatu Marumagan after his debut project Neengatha Ennam starring Bhanu Chander's son Jayanth, was shelved. Melnaatu Marumagan was to be produced by Bahadur Sha, with music by Kishore Kumar and cinematography by Gautham Krishna. Andreanne Nouyrigat, a resident of Pondicherry who has appeared in Tamil cinema, was then recruited to star in the lead role alongside Rajkamal. In the film, she dubbed her own lines in Tamil.

The film was completed by January 2015, but a potential release date in February 2015 was bypassed. Following three years of delays and a change of producer, the team began promotions planning to release the film in early 2018. The team also announced plans of potentially releasing the film in France.

Release
The film was released on 16 February 2018 across Tamil Nadu. In their review of the film, critic Suganth of The Times of India gave the film 0.5 stars out of 5, adding "it is the kind of film that makes you wonder why it was made in the first place and for whom". The critic added "and the all-round bad acting only makes it worse" and "by the time we reach the interval point, you stop worrying about the movie’s existence and start questioning your own".

Soundtrack

The film's music was composed by V. Kishorkumar. The soundtrack was released on 22 August 2016 through Auro Music. The song "Yaroival" was written by lyricist Na. Muthukumar within thirty minutes on a car journey he had to Chennai airport.

References

External links
 

2018 films
2010s Tamil-language films
Indian action films
2018 directorial debut films
2018 action films